Staphylococcus felis is a Gram-positive, coagulase-negative member of the bacterial genus Staphylococcus consisting of clustered cocci.  It demonstrates limited hemolytic activity, but it does show evidence of urease activity and the ability to use sucrose, mannose, and trehalose. S. felis has been isolated from and is associated with skin infections in cats.

References

Further reading

External links
Type strain of Staphylococcus felis at BacDive -  the Bacterial Diversity Metadatabase

felis
Bacteria described in 1989